Radeburg is a town in the district of Meißen, in Saxony, Germany. It is situated 19 km east of Meißen, and 18 km north of Dresden. The main tourist attraction is the narrow-gauge Radebeul-Radeburg railway line that connects Radeburg and Radebeul via Moritzburg. The painter and illustrator Heinrich Zille was born in Radeburg.

References 

Meissen (district)